"Back to My Roots" is a song by American dance music singer and drag queen RuPaul, released as the fourth single from his album Supermodel of the World, released on April 27, 1993. Although the single failed to chart on the Billboard Hot 100, it reached number one on the Hot Dance Club Play chart in July 1993 and helped to further establish RuPaul's popularity, particularly with both the dance music and LGBT audiences in the United States.

The house/dance track is a tribute to black women's hairstyles as well as to the tradition of community often found in urban hair salons. The song was originally entitled "Black to My Roots", but the record company changed it fearing controversy. Within the song RuPaul name-checks a variety of hairstyles such as braids, hair extensions, afro-puffs and cornrows. She also names several of her relatives including her mother Ernestine Charles, who at the time owned a hair salon in Atlanta, Georgia.

The single was released primarily as a CD but with various 12-inch versions. It also featured a new remix of the hit single "Supermodel (You Better Work)", as well as a pastiche of the track called "Strudelmodel", which changed the theme of the original to a "model for the Der Wienerschnitzel Corporation".

An accompanying music video showcased extreme drag versions of all of these hairstyles. Though it was played occasionally on MTV, it received far more play in dance clubs. It also featured noted comedian LaWanda Page as Ms. Ernestine Charles.

Critical reception
Larry Flick from Billboard described it as "a festive house ditty that extolls the creativity of African-American hair fashion." He added, "Eric Kupper's production is heavy on smart beats and disco charm, while Ru unleashes a flood of charisma and funny raps. An instant club hit poised for radio success." Sam Wood from Philadelphia Inquirer felt the song succeed at "being more than celebrations of surface".

Track listing
(Tracks vary according to release; this listing reflects the tracks on the American CD version, which sold the most copies.)

 "Back to My Roots" (7" version)
 "Back to My Roots" (Jheri Curl Juice Mix)
 "Back to My Roots" (Murk's Curl Activator Mix)
 "Supermodel (You Better Work)" (Work It Mr. DJ Tribal Mix)
 "Back to My Roots" (Oscar G's Dope Dub)
 "Back to My Roots" (Jheri Curl Juice Dub)
 "Strudelmodel"

Italian promo vinyl (listed as "Back to My Roots - Remix")

Side One (Secchi Side):
 "Back to My Roots" (Secchi's Extended Mix) [6:05]
Side Two (Statement Side):
 "Back to My Roots" (Back to Our Concept Mix) [6:16]
 "Back to My Roots" (Back to Our Concept Mix - Instrumental) [6:16]

Charts

References

1992 songs
1993 singles
RuPaul songs
Songs written by Jimmy Harry
Tommy Boy Records singles
African-American hair